Personal lubricants (colloquially termed lube) are specialized lubricants used during sexual acts, such as intercourse and masturbation, to reduce friction to or between the penis and vagina, anus or other body parts or applied to sex toys to reduce friction or to ease penetration. Surgical or medical lubricants or gels, which are similar to personal lubricants but not usually referred to or labelled as "personal" lubricants, may be used for medical purposes such as speculum insertion or introduction of a catheter. The primary difference between personal and surgical lubricants is that surgical lubricants are thicker, sterile gels, typically containing a bacteriostatic agent. As of 2015 the personal lubricant market was estimated to be worth at least $400 million.

Types

By composition

Water-based
Water-based personal lubricants are water-soluble and are the most widely used personal lubricants. The earliest water-based lubricants were cellulose ether or glycerin solutions. Products available today may have various agents added for even dispersal, moisture retention, and resistance to contamination. The viscosity of these products can be altered by adjusting their water content and concentration of cellulose or other gel-forming hydrophilic ingredient. Because water-based personal lubricants absorb into the skin and evaporate, most water-based lubricants have a tendency to dry out during use, but reapplication of the lubricant or application of water or saliva is usually sufficient to reactivate them. When the lubricant eventually dries out, it may leave behind a residue derived from the other ingredients in the formulation. This may require reapplication during sex, and/or removal of the residue with water. Scientists are testing whether anti-retroviral lubricants or gels can be applied to aid in the prevention of transmission of HIV.

Typical water-based lubricants may be incompatible with sex acts that occur in water (such as in a bathtub, pool, or hot tub) as they can be dissolved or dispersed in water.

The Population Council, in a 2011 study, tested commercially available water-based sexual lubricants, and found that many damaged human rectal cells and that some of them – those containing polyquaternium-15 – appeared to actively increase HIV replication in cell cultures and therefore could raise one's risk of HIV transmission. Water-based 'lubes' have been recommended for use in safer sex because they do not weaken condoms like oil-based lubricants do. The researchers concluded: "Since it is the condom that is protecting users from HIV rather than the lube, condom users should still be encouraged to use water-based lubes because condoms are also more likely to break, and trauma to the rectal lining occur, with no lube". They also cited silicone-based lubricants as a potential alternative, although they did not test any silicone lubes in their study.

A later study has validated the findings of the Population Council for some water-based products' hyper-osmolality causing some human's cells damage, and better bio-compatibility with low-osmolality water-based products and silicone-based products but failed to corroborate polyquaternium 15 having a role that binds HIV to rectal cells or increase HIV replication.

Oil-based
Oil-based lubricants, for example petroleum-based lubricants (such as petroleum jelly), can increase the likelihood of breakage and slipping of latex condoms due to loss of elasticity caused by these lubricants. Oil-based lubricants may be considered desirable for people who are in relationships not requiring condom use and who wish to avoid certain additives and preservatives often found in other lubricants.

Silicone-based
Silicone-based lubricants do not contain any water. They offer a different feel from water-based personal lubricants. Silicone-based lubricants are not absorbed by skin or mucous membranes and consequently last longer than water-based lubricants. Many different silicone lubricants are commercially available, with varying quality and performance. Not all silicone-based lubricants are certified latex-safe, but silicone-based lubricants have not been shown to increase the risk of HIV transmission during anal intercourse, as some water-based lubes have.

Silicone-based lubricants are not usually recommended for use with sex toys or other products that are made from silicone because the formula may dissolve the surface, making it sticky to the touch, and cause disintegration of the item over time. This damage may create a breeding ground for bacteria. In most cases, a warning is listed on the product label. Silicone-based lubricant is also used in the manufacture of pre-lubricated condoms, due to its long-lasting properties and superior latex compatibility.

By usage

Vaginal lubricants
Vaginal lubricants are used to reduce vaginal dryness and pain during intercourse, and by couples trying to conceive. During fertility interventions, the use of a lubricant eases sperm specimen collection by masturbation. Commonly used lubricants include saliva, oil (such as baby oil, olive oil, canola oil, or mineral oil) or commercially available lubricants that are either water-based or hydroxyethylcellulose-based.

Human saliva and olive oil have been found to be detrimental to sperm function. Certain commonly used commercial lubricants, although labeled as non-spermicidal or spermicidal agent-free, have been found to impair sperm function, with several of these lubricants being as toxic to sperm in vitro as contraceptive gels. Sperm motility and viability were found to be disrupted shortly after direct contact between sperm and those lubricants or in saliva. Sperm function could be compromised following lubricant contact, due to the specific ingredients in the lubricant or due to the chemical properties of the lubricant, such as highly raised osmolarity or low pH. Such lubricants are therefore unsafe for use during fertility procedures such as semen collection or by couples trying to conceive by natural or assisted reproduction.

Vaginal lubricants such as mineral oil, canola oil, or hydroxyethylcellulose-based lubricants are recommended for use by couples attempting conception by The Practice Committee of the American Society for Reproductive Medicine.

Anal-specific
Many lubricants are safe for anal sex, but there are products that are specifically marketed or designed to enhance enjoyment of anal sex. Often, this is simply a thicker gel rather than a liquid. This thicker consistency is preferable because it helps the lubricant stay in place. Some anal lubricants contain numbing agents to relieve discomfort during anal sex, although it is generally inadvisable as a lack of sensation makes accidental injury more likely. Additionally, a commonly used numbing agent benzocaine can cause an allergic reaction in those with an allergy to PABA (4-aminobenzoic acid). Some lubricants are conveniently packaged for ease of application. Many of these products such as Astroglide Shooters have been pulled from the market due to FDA Medical Device Requirements. Products containing benzocaine can numb all body parts with which they come in contact.

Organic or natural
In the United States, the first certified organic personal lubricant labeled with the USDA organic seal was Nude Personal Lubricant, which was created in 2004 by Applied Organics. The US Food and Drug Administration (FDA) regulates lubricant as a medical device rather than as a cosmetic. Because of strict FDA guidelines for medical devices, organic personal lubricants were no longer allowed to carry a USDA seal, and they should be very careful about using the term organic anywhere on the label. Many of these types of lubricants also market themselves as "natural" and do not contain paraben, glycerin, diethanolamine (DEA) or animal-based ingredients. Some contain botanicals such as aloe vera or plant extracts.

Specialty lubricants
Warming lubricants contain specific ingredients to cause a sensation of warmth. Breathing on these types of lubricants may increase the effect. "Cooling" or "tingling" lubricants may contain ingredients such as peppermint. Some lubricants are sold together, such as "hot and cold", or are marketed for a specific use or effect. Flavored lubricants contain flavorings, such as fruit flavors, to enhance oral contact. "Edible" lubricants may be flavored and/or may not contain any ingredients that are not advisable to eat.

Other
Other products that have been used as personal lubricants include vegetable shortening, which is durable and inexpensive but damaging to latex. In a controversial scene in the movie Last Tango in Paris, the character Paul, played by Marlon Brando, uses butter during anal sex with the character Jeanne, played by Maria Schneider.

Uses

Sexual activity
A personal lubricant can be used to increase pleasure and reduce pain during sexual intercourse or other activities and may be used for lubricating the penis, vagina, anus, stroker or dildo or other sex toys before or during activity. Lubricant may be applied to any body part desired, to the inside and/or outside of condoms, or to the hands or fingers. Personal lubricants are particularly useful for intercourse when a partner experiences dryness or excessive contraction (tightness) of the vagina or anus. Anal sex generally requires more generous application of lubricant since the anus does not have natural lubrication sufficient for most sexual activity.

Masturbation
While most males and females produce varying amounts of their own lubrication, extra lubrication is sometimes sought when needed. There are specific lubricants which may be used in male masturbation, often called "masturbation creams," but are not suitable for vaginal or anal use or for use with condoms. Many men in Japan use lubricant created specifically for onaholes such as the Tenga Egg. Lubricant that is safe for sexual intercourse is also safe for masturbation.

Hand lotion is often used for recreational masturbation and popularly seen as an alternative to lubricants created specifically for sexual intercourse.

Medicine
Enema and rectal thermometer tips should be lubricated before use to minimize friction while inserting through the tightly retentive anal sphincter.

Personal lubricants can help treat erectile dysfunction in older men.

Risks

As of December 2012, the U.S. Food & Drug Administration does not typically require testing of personal lubricants in humans.  The agency classifies them as medical devices, so testing occurs on animals such as rabbits and guinea pigs. Rectal use of lubricants is viewed by the agency as an off-label application.  In 2012 it was reported that participants who consistently used personal lubricants for rectal intercourse had a higher prevalence of sexually transmitted infections (STI), such as chlamydia, than inconsistent users. Some warming lubricants have been shown to have an osmolality count more than 30 times the body's own fluid. Increased herpes transmission was more than ninefold when compared with animals not administered lubricant. In 2007 it was demonstrated that certain lubricants can cause significant damage to the rectal tissue of human study participants – major shedding of cells from tissue samples biopsied 60 to 90 minutes after lubricant application was observed. Certain lubricants containing the ingredient chlorhexidine, an antibacterial agent, has been shown to kill three species of Lactobacillus and has been shown to unbalance the natural flora in the vagina, which might lead to infections such as bacterial vaginosis. Lubricants with osmolalities closer to that of the body, such as agar-based lubes, did not damage the tissue samples or boost HIV infection rates.

Some may experience irritation from the use of certain lubricants. Some lubricants (as mentioned above under Water-based have been found to damage cells or even increase the replication of the HIV virus. Nonoxynol-9, a spermicide contained in some lubricants, can destroy vaginal and rectum cell membranes which may increase the rate of STI transmission. Spermicidally lubricated condoms do not contain enough spermicide to increase contraceptive effectiveness, but application of separate spermicide is thought to reduce pregnancy rates significantly.

References

 

ja:ラブローション